Chang'an is a town under the administration of Gaocheng City in southwestern Hebei province, China, located  southeast of downtown Gaocheng. , it has 18 villages under its administration.

See also
List of township-level divisions of Hebei

References

Township-level divisions of Hebei